Wolfgang Strödter (5 April 1948 – 4 June 2021) was a field hockey player from Germany, who was a member of the West-German team that won the gold medal at the 1972 Summer Olympics in Munich.

Strödter was a terrific hitter of penalty corners. He coached the West German Women's National Team at the 1988 Summer Olympics in Seoul, South Korea.

References

External links
 

1948 births
2021 deaths
People from Bad Homburg vor der Höhe
Sportspeople from Darmstadt (region)
German male field hockey players
German field hockey coaches
Olympic field hockey players of West Germany
Field hockey players at the 1972 Summer Olympics
Field hockey players at the 1976 Summer Olympics
Olympic gold medalists for West Germany
Medalists at the 1972 Summer Olympics
Olympic medalists in field hockey
20th-century German people